This is a graphical lifespan timeline of presidents of South Korea.  The presidents are listed in order of office.

Graphical timelines